Warawara Lake may refer to:

 Warawara Lake (Cochabamba), Bolivia
 Warawara Lake (Oruro), Bolivia
 Warawara Lake (Potosí), Bolivia